Oxytelus is a genus of spiny-legged rove beetles in the family Staphylinidae. There are more than 50 described species in Oxytelus.

Species
These 57 species belong to the genus Oxytelus:

 Oxytelus antennalis Fauvel, 1889
 Oxytelus assingi Schuelke, 2012
 Oxytelus atricapillus Germar, 1825
 Oxytelus bengalensis Erichson, 1840
 Oxytelus bicornis Germar, 1823
 Oxytelus chapini Blackwelder
 Oxytelus consobrinus Stephens, 1834
 Oxytelus convergens LeConte, 1877
 Oxytelus cornutus Bernhauer, 1936
 Oxytelus crenaticollis
 Oxytelus densus Casey
 Oxytelus depauperatus Wollaston, 1867
 Oxytelus eremus Blackwelder
 Oxytelus ferrugineus Kraatz, 1859
 Oxytelus fortesculpturatus Scheerpeltz
 Oxytelus foveicollis Scheerpeltz
 Oxytelus fulvipes Erichson, 1839
 Oxytelus fusciceps Fauvel, 1898
 Oxytelus fuscipennis Stephens, 1834
 Oxytelus hostilis Bernhauer
 Oxytelus incisus Motschulsky, 1857
 Oxytelus incolumis Erichson, 1840
 Oxytelus invenustus Casey, 1894
 Oxytelus jacobsoni Cameron, 1928
 Oxytelus laqueatus (Marsham, 1802)
 Oxytelus luceus Bidessus
 Oxytelus malaisei Scheerpeltz
 Oxytelus mashonensis
 Oxytelus megaceros Fabricius
 Oxytelus migrator Fauvel, 1904
 Oxytelus miles Cameron, 1928
 Oxytelus montanus Casey, 1894
 Oxytelus mortuorum Bidessus
 Oxytelus nigriceps Kraatz
 Oxytelus nigripennis Bernhauer
 Oxytelus nimius Casey, 1894
 Oxytelus okahandjanus
 Oxytelus pallipennis Grimmer, 1841
 Oxytelus parvulus Mulsant & Rey, 1861
 Oxytelus pensylvanicus Erichson, 1840
 Oxytelus piceus (Linnaeus, 1767)
 Oxytelus planicollis Scheerpeltz
 Oxytelus pluvius Blackwelder
 Oxytelus pristinus Scudder, 1876
 Oxytelus puncticeps Kraatz
 Oxytelus rufulus
 Oxytelus schubotzi Bernhauer
 Oxytelus sculptus Gravenhorst, 1806
 Oxytelus striaticeps Cameron, 1928
 Oxytelus subapterus Wickham, 1913
 Oxytelus subsculpturates Cameron, 1928
 Oxytelus tenuesculpturatus Sch.
 Oxytelus uncifer
 Oxytelus varipennis Kraatz
 † Oxytelus levis Förster, 1891
 † Oxytelus ominosus Förster, 1891
 † Oxytelus proaevus Heer, 1862

References

Further reading

External links

 

Oxytelinae
Articles created by Qbugbot